Prong is an American heavy metal band formed in New York City in 1986. The band is fronted by guitarist/vocalist Tommy Victor, Prong's sole constant member. To date, they have released 12 studio albums (including a covers album), one live album, four EPs, one DVD and one remix album.

Prong had two independent releases, Primitive Origins (1987) and Force Fed (1989), which attracted the attention of Epic Records, who signed the band in 1989. Their first two albums on Epic, Beg to Differ (1990) and Prove You Wrong (1991), were released to critical acclaim and garnered attention on MTV's Headbangers Ball. The band's 1994 album Cleansing was also successful, and included one of their well-known songs "Snap Your Fingers, Snap Your Neck". After releasing one more album (Rude Awakening in 1996), Prong disbanded in 1997, but reformed in 2002 and has continued to tour and record since then.

History

Early days (1986–1989)
The band was founded in 1986 by singer/guitarist Tommy Victor (then a sound engineer for the New York City music club CBGB) and bassist Mike Kirkland (doorman at CBGB), who recruited ex-Swans drummer Ted Parsons shortly after. Prong independently released an EP, Primitive Origins, and a studio album, Force Fed, in the late 1980s, which were noted for their very raw sound.

Major label signing and underground success (1989–1995)
Prong signed with Epic Records in 1989. Their major label debut album, Beg to Differ, was released in 1990.

In the following year, Kirkland left the band and was replaced by bassist Troy Gregory. Prong issued their fourth release, Prove You Wrong, which saw the band experiment with programming and electronic samples while still retaining an aggressive yet melodic sensibility.

By 1994, Troy Gregory was out of the band and was replaced by Paul Raven and John Bechdel, both from Killing Joke and Murder, Inc. The new line-up released Cleansing (Prong's fifth major release). With a slight industrial metal influence, Cleansing contained songs that are still considered Prong classics ("Broken Peace" and "Snap Your Fingers, Snap Your Neck") and is Prong's most successful release to date. The videos for these two songs became staples of MTV's Headbangers Ball. The band toured America with Sepultura and Pantera as an opener for their respective Chaos A.D. and Far Beyond Driven tours. They also undertook a headlining European tour with Life of Agony and The Obsessed as their support.

Demise (1996–2002)
Prong's 5th album Rude Awakening was released in 1996. It entered the charts at No. 107 and sold 10,000 units in the United States in its first week. Despite the good sales, Epic Records released the band from their contract three weeks after the album's release. Shortly thereafter, Raven left prior to a tour supporting Type O Negative and was replaced by Rob "Blasko" Nicholson. Mike Riggs later joined on guitar so Victor could focus more on vocals. This line-up later disbanded, with Victor joining Danzig as their guitar player, and Ted Parsons joining Godflesh. Parsons also played with Jesu and toured with Paul Raven in Killing Joke.

Interim (2002–2006)
In 2002, Victor re-formed Prong with bassist Brian Perry (Dirty Looks, Jake E. Lee), drummer Dan Laudo and guitarist Monte Pittman (Madonna). In 2002, after a 42-show American tour that was recorded for a live CD (100% Live, Locomotive Music) Prong entered the studio and recorded a new CD titled Scorpio Rising which was received with mixed responses.

Victor played on and off again with Glenn Danzig from 1998 to 2005 in between time with Prong. His final goal of playing and writing on a Danzig record was met with Circle of Snakes in 2004.

Prong released a live two-disc DVD in 2005 entitled The Vault which features performances from the Hulstsfred and With Full Force festivals and a full show in Amsterdam. This disc has Brian Perry and Mike Longworth on bass as Longworth replaced Perry after his departure in 2003. Dan Laudo left the band in 2005 and the band enlisted Aaron Rossi, who used to be in the bands Strife (Victory Records), Shelter (Century Media Records), John 5 (Shrapnel Records), and Ankla (Bieler Bros. Records)

Victor and Raven joined Ministry in 2005 to write and tour in support of their 2006 album Rio Grande Blood. The two also appear on Ministry's follow-up album The Last Sucker (2007), although in a more limited capacity.

Reformation (2007–present)

In 2007, Prong signed to Al Jourgensen's 13th Planet Records, who released Power of the Damager on October 2, 2007. The band embarked on the "Slicing Across America" and "Slicing Across Europe" tours supporting the album in 2007 and early 2008. Joining Tommy Victor for the tour were Monte Pittman and drummer Aaron Rossi; bassist Paul Raven had died of a heart attack in his sleep on October 20, 2007, at the age of 46.

Rossi joined Ministry as their new drummer on the "C U LaTour" which started in March 2008.

Alexei Rodriguez and Tony Campos from Static-X were on the lineup with Tommy supporting Soulfly on the "Blood Fire War Hate" tour in the fall of 2009. They were replaced by Jason Christopher (bass) in 2011 and Art Cruz (drums) in 2012.

The band supported Fear Factory on their tour which ended on June 6, 2010. Prong released a new album, Carved into Stone, on April 23, 2012, with Long Branch Records/SPV. It was produced by Steve Evetts. The band toured as a headliner and with acts such as Crowbar in the US, and in May 2012 performed Beg to Differ in its entirety during a two-week tour in Europe.

In the summer of 2013, the band performed an extensive European festival and headline run and also recorded a self-released "Official Bootleg" entitled Unleashed in the West – Live in Berlin via Bandcamp.com.

After spending November and December 2013 in the studio, Prong released their ninth album, Ruining Lives, on Steamhammer/SPV in April 2014 and toured extensively in its support. Blabbermouth.net called the album "Tommy Victor's personal liberation." The album was produced by Victor and mixed by Steve Evetts.

The band started a second wave of touring behind Ruining Lives in July 2014, with European festivals and headline shows. They also toured in North America, both as headliners and as support to Overkill, followed by a tour in Europe as main support to Overkill in October and November.

In 2015, the band released the cover album Songs from the Black Hole, followed a year later by their eleventh studio album X – No Absolutes. Another album, Zero Days, was released in 2017. In 2017, at the beginning of August, they played a concert in Polish Woodstock Festival. Prong's next release was the EP Age of Defiance, released on November 29, 2019. They also have a new full-length studio album in the works.

Musical style, influences and legacy
Prong has been described as groove metal, industrial metal, thrash metal and crossover thrash, and is known for combining elements of thrash metal, groove metal, and industrial. Emerging from the New York hardcore scene, Prong, along with bands such as Pantera, Sepultura and Machine Head, is one of the bands of the groove metal movement of the 1990s.

Prong cited Killing Joke and Chrome as influences. They have influenced many notable musicians such as Korn's Jonathan Davis, Demon Hunter's Ryan Clark and Nine Inch Nails' Trent Reznor, as well as bands such as Pantera and White Zombie.

Members

Current members 
 Tommy Victor – guitars, lead vocals (1986–present)
 Jason Christopher – bass, backing vocals (2012–2016, 2017–present)
 Griffin McCarthy – drums (2022–present)
 Jason Bittner – drums (European tour 2023)

Former members 
 Ted Parsons – drums (1986–1996)
 John Tempesta – drums (1997)
 Dan Laudo – drums (2002–2005)
 Alexei Rodriguez – drums (2009–2013)
 Art Cruz – drums (2014–2018)
 Aaron Rossi – drums (2005–2009, 2018–2021)
 Mike Kirkland – bass, backing vocals (1986–1990)
 Troy Gregory – bass (1991–1993)
 Paul Raven – bass (1993–1996; died 2007)
 Rob "Blasko" Nicholson – bass (1996)
 Frank Cavanagh – bass (1997)
 Brian Perry – bass (2002–2003)
 Monte Pittman – bass (2002, 2006–2009), guitars (2002, 2003–2006)
 Mike Longworth – bass, backing vocals (2003–2006, 2016–2017)
 Tony Campos – bass (2009–2012)
 Mike Riggs – guitars (1996-1997)
 John Bechdel – keyboards, programming (1993–1995)
 Charlie Clouser – keyboards, programming (1995–1996)

Former live musicians 
 Joseph Bishara – keyboards (1994)
 Vince Dennis – bass (1996)
 Matthew Brunson – bass (2012)
 Dave Pybus – bass (2012)
 Fred Ziomek – bass, backing vocals (2019–2020)

Timeline

Discography

 Force Fed (1989)
 Beg to Differ (1990)
 Prove You Wrong (1991)
 Cleansing (1994)
 Rude Awakening (1996)
 Scorpio Rising (2003)
 Power of the Damager (2007)
 Carved into Stone (2012)
 Ruining Lives (2014)
 Songs from the Black Hole (2015)
 X – No Absolutes (2016)
 Zero Days (2017)

References

External links

 
 
 

1986 establishments in New York City
Musical groups from New York City
American groove metal musical groups
American industrial metal musical groups
American thrash metal musical groups
Crossover thrash groups
Heavy metal musical groups from New York (state)
Musical groups established in 1986
American musical trios
Locomotive Music artists
Epic Records artists
Steamhammer Records artists